Trevor White (born 27 April 1984) is a Canadian alpine skier.

He competed at the 2010 Winter Olympics in Vancouver in the men's slalom competition.

References

External links
 Trevor White at the 2010 Winter Olympics
 Trevor White's Personal Website
 Alpine Canada Website

1984 births
Living people
Olympic alpine skiers of Canada
Skiers from Calgary
Alpine skiers at the 2010 Winter Olympics
Canadian male alpine skiers